This table displays the top-rated primetime television series of the 1986–87 season as measured by Nielsen Media Research.

References

1986 in American television
1987 in American television
1986-related lists
1987-related lists
Lists of American television series